Brian Patoir (6 May 1927 – 12 April 1969) was a Guyanese cricketer. He played in nine first-class matches for British Guiana from 1950 to 1959.

See also
 List of Guyanese representative cricketers

References

External links
 

1927 births
1969 deaths
Guyanese cricketers
Guyana cricketers
Sportspeople from Georgetown, Guyana